William Clayton Anderson (December 26, 1826 – December 23, 1861) was a nineteenth-century slave owner, lawyer, and politician. He served as a United States representative from Kentucky.

Early life and career
Anderson was born in Lancaster, Garrard County, Kentucky, the son of Simeon H. Anderson and nephew of Albert G. Talbott. He attended private schools and graduated from Centre College, Danville, Kentucky in 1845. He then studied law and was admitted to the bar. He began his practice in Lancaster and in 1847 moved to Danville and continued practicing law.

Anderson served as a member of the Kentucky House of Representatives from 1851 to 1853. He was a presidential elector on the American Party ticket of Millard Fillmore and Donaldson in 1856. An unsuccessful candidate for the Thirty-fifth Congress, Anderson was elected two years later as an Opposition Party candidate to the Thirty-sixth Congress, serving from March 4, 1859 to March 3, 1861. He chose not to seek reelection; and was elected instead as a Unionist candidate to the Kentucky House of Representatives.

Death
Anderson died on December 23, 1861 while on the house floor during a session of the legislature in Frankfort, Kentucky . He died three days before he would have been 35 years old. He is interred at Bellevue Cemetery in Danville, Kentucky.

References

Further reading

External links

Govtrack US Congress
The Political Graveyard

1826 births
1861 deaths
Burials in Bellevue Cemetery (Danville, Kentucky)
People from Lancaster, Kentucky
Kentucky Know Nothings
Opposition Party members of the United States House of Representatives from Kentucky
Kentucky Unionists
Members of the Kentucky House of Representatives
Politicians from Danville, Kentucky
Centre College alumni
19th-century American politicians
Members of the United States House of Representatives from Kentucky